Mignini is a surname. Notable people with the surname include:

Franco Mignini (1921–1987), Venezuelan sports shooter
Giuliano Mignini (born 1950), Italian public prosecutor
Mariano Mignini (born 1975), Argentine footballer

See also
Magnini